Kiira Dosdall-Arena (born July 31, 1987) is an American professional ice hockey player, who currently plays with the Metropolitan Riveters of the Premier Hockey Federation (PHF). She has previously won two Elite Women's Hockey League championships and one Isobel Cup, and is the seventh longest tenured player in PHF history, one of the few still active from the league's inaugural season.

Playing career

Early career 
From 2005 to 2009, Dosdall played for the Colgate Raiders ice hockey team, serving as the team's captain in her senior season. Across 134 NCAA games with Colgate, she scored 63 points. She was nominated for the 2008-09 Patty Kazmaier Award.

Professional 
After graduating, Dosdall moved to Austria to join the EHV Sabres Vienna of the Austrian Women's Ice Hockey Bundesliga (DEBL) and the Elite Women's Hockey League (EWHL), where she would play until 2013. As an import player, she received a stipend from the team to cover her housing costs. Dosdall was the first player to be named to the EWHL All-Star Team four years in a row.

In 2013, she returned to North America to sign with the Boston Blades of the CWHL. In her debut CWHL season, she failed to pick up a point in 11 regular season games, before notching one assist in four playoff games. After the team lost in the Clarkson Cup finals against the Toronto Furies, she announced her retirement from hockey.

Dosdall came out of retirement to join the New York Riveters for the NWHL's inaugural season in 2015–16. She scored 7 points in 18 games in her debut NWHL season.

In August 2016, the Riveters announced that Dosdall and team captain Ashley Johnston had each signed a one-year contract worth $13,500 to continue with the franchise in the 2016/17 season. In 2017, Dosdall became an alternate captain for the New York Riveters after the retirement of Morgan Fritz-Ward.

She was named to the 2020 NWHL All-Star game as a member of Team Dempsey.

Personal life
Dosdall is a graduate of Colgate University in New York, USA.  In addition to her playing career, Dosdall has worked as a project specialist for Schoology.

References

External links
 

1987 births
Living people
Ice hockey players from Connecticut
Sportspeople from Stamford, Connecticut
American women's ice hockey defensemen
Metropolitan Riveters players
New York Riveters players
Boston Blades players
Colgate Raiders women's ice hockey players
American expatriate ice hockey players in Austria
European Women's Hockey League players